Louis Lancaster (born 9 October 1981) is an English professional football coach, notable for his role as head coach of Chinese Taipei national football team and coaching Jadon Sancho.

Early life
Born in Barking, Lancaster was raised in Hatfield in Hertfordshire. During his youth he had stints at professional academies however failed to secure a contract. Lancaster played semi-professional football for Welwyn Garden City, Hertford Town, Berkhamsted and Wealdstone.

Managerial career
Lancaster holds a UEFA Pro License and an Elite Coaching License. He has held coaching positions at Portsmouth and Brentford. He also worked with future England international Jadon Sancho during his time at Watford, where he spent three seasons.

In 2011, Lancaster was selected as one of 16 coaches from the past decade to participate in the inaugural FA Elite Coaches Award delivered by Dick Bate and Alistair Smith. He went on to complete his UEFA Pro Licence in 2013 where he also completed an in-depth study on the topic of mavericks. It was on this course he met Gary White. Lancaster assisted White at Shanghai Shenxin in China League One and with the Chinese Taipei national football team. In their time with the National Team, they reached the nation's highest ever FIFA ranking and won their first title in 49 years.

Chinese Taipei national team 
Lancaster was appointed the head coach of the Chinese Taipei national team on 18 January 2019, his first senior management position.

Lancaster secured his first win charge on 11 June 2019, when Taiwan defeated Hong Kong 0–2, with both goals scored by Chen Hao-wei. He was sacked in December 2019.

Utah Royals 
On 18 February 2020, Utah Royals announced that Lancaster had joined as an assistant. Lancaster's time in Utah came to an end in December 2020 when it was announced that the Royals would cease operations and their player-related assets transferred to the expansion Kansas City NWSL team.

Career statistics

References

1981 births
Living people
Footballers from Barking, London
English footballers
Association footballers not categorized by position
Wealdstone F.C. players
Hertford Town F.C. players
Berkhamsted F.C. players
Welwyn Garden City F.C. players
Alumni of the University of Bath
English football managers
Arsenal W.F.C. non-playing staff
Watford F.C. non-playing staff
Portsmouth F.C. non-playing staff
Brentford F.C. non-playing staff
Shanghai Shenxin F.C. non-playing staff
Chinese Taipei national football team non-playing staff
English expatriate football managers
English expatriate sportspeople in China
English expatriate sportspeople in Taiwan
Expatriate football managers in Taiwan
Utah Royals FC non-playing staff
Chinese Taipei national football team managers